Running Wild is a 2006 South Korean film.

Plot 
Jang Do-young is a homicide detective who likes to use violence when dealing with criminals, while Oh Jin-woo is a prosecutor who believes in the importance of data and evidence. After the murder of his younger half-brother, Do-young and Jin-woo meet when Do-young interrupts a stakeout in an attempt at vengeance. The unlikely duo join forces to bring gangster boss Yu Kang-jin to justice, but find that he is too well connected. Being unsuccessful in bringing Yu Kang-jin to justice the duo turn to violence in order to bring him down.

Cast 
 Kwon Sang-woo as Jang Do-young
 Yoo Ji-tae as Oh Jin-woo
 Son Byong-ho as Yu Kang-jin
 Lee Joo-sil
 Kang Sung-jin
 Jeong Won-joong
 Uhm Ji-won
 Choi Deok-moon as Inspector Park
 Jo Sung-ha
 Kim Yoon-seok
 Ahn Gil-kang

Release 
Running Wild was released in South Korea on 12 January 2006, and on its opening weekend was ranked second at the box office with 389,370 admissions.

References

External links 
 
 
 

2006 films
2000s Korean-language films
South Korean crime thriller films
South Korean action films
Showbox films
2000s South Korean films